Wagtails are a group of passerine birds that form the genus Motacilla in the family Motacillidae. The forest wagtail belongs to the monotypic genus Dendronanthus which is closely related to Motacilla and sometimes included therein. The common name and genus names are derived from their characteristic tail pumping behaviour. Together with the pipits and longclaws they form the family Motacillidae.

The willie wagtail (Rhipidura leucophrys) of Australia is an unrelated bird similar in coloration and shape to the Japanese wagtail. It belongs to the fantails.

Taxonomy

The genus Motacilla was introduced by the Swedish naturalist Carl Linnaeus in 1758 in the tenth edition of his Systema Naturae.  The type species is the white wagtail. Motacilla is the Latin name for the pied wagtail; although actually a diminutive of motare, "to move about", from medieval times it led to the misunderstanding of cilla as "tail".

At first glance, the wagtails appear to be divided into a yellow-bellied group and a white-bellied one, or one where the upper head is black and another where it is usually grey, but may be olive, yellow, or other colours. However, these are not evolutionary lineages; change of belly colour and increase of melanin have occurred independently several times in the wagtails, and the colour patterns which actually indicate relationships are more subtle.

mtDNA cytochrome b and NADH dehydrogenase subunit 2 sequence data (Voelker, 2002) is of limited use: the suspicion that there is a superspecies of probably three white-bellied, black-throated wagtails is confirmed. Also, there is another superspecies in sub-Saharan Africa, three white-throated species with a black breast-band. The remaining five species are highly variable morphologically and their relationships with each other and with the two clades have not yet been satisfactorily explained.

The origin of the genus appears to be in the general area of Eastern Siberia/Mongolia. Wagtails spread rapidly across Eurasia and dispersed to Africa in the Zanclean (Early Pliocene)
where the sub-Saharan lineage was later isolated. The African pied wagtail (and possibly the Mekong wagtail) diverged prior to the massive radiation of the white-bellied black-throated and most yellow-bellied forms, all of which took place during the late Piacenzian (early Late Pliocene), c. 3 mya.

Three species are poly- or paraphyletic in the present taxonomical arrangement and either subspecies need to be reassigned and/or species split up. The blue-headed wagtail (AKA yellow wagtail and many other names), especially, has always been a taxonomical nightmare with over a dozen currently accepted subspecies and many more invalid ones. The two remaining "monochrome" species, Mekong and African pied wagtail may be closely related, or a most striking example of convergent evolution.

Prehistoric wagtails known from fossils are Motacilla humata and Motacilla major.

Characteristics
Wagtails are slender, often colourful, ground-feeding insectivores of open country in the Old World. Species of wagtail breed in Africa, Europe and Asia, some of which are fully or partially migratory.  Two species also breed in Alaska, and wintering birds may reach Australia.

They are ground nesters, laying up to six speckled eggs at a time. Among their most conspicuous behaviours is a near constant tail wagging, a trait that has given the birds their common name. In spite of the ubiquity of the behaviour and observations of it, the reasons for it are poorly understood. It has been suggested that it may flush up prey, or that it may signal submissiveness to other wagtails. Recent studies have suggested instead that it is a signal of vigilance that may aid to deter potential predators.

Species list
The genus contains 13 species.

Former species in this genus
Formerly, some authorities also considered the following species (or subspecies) as species within the genus Motacilla:
 Superb fairywren (as Motacilla cyanea)
 Red-whiskered bulbul (emeria) (as Motacilla emeria)

References

Sources
 Voelker, Gary (2002): "Systematics and historical biogeography of wagtails: Dispersal versus vicariance revisited". Condor 104(4): 725–739. [English with Spanish abstract] DOI: 10.1650/0010-5422(2002)104[0725:SAHBOW]2.0.CO;2 . HTML abstract

External links

Wagtail videos on the Internet Bird Collection

Taxa named by Carl Linnaeus